Divandarreh County is in Kurdistan province, Iran. The capital of the county is the city of Divandarreh. At the 2006 census, the county's population was 82,628 in 17,335 households. The following census in 2011 counted 81,963 people in 19,843 households. At the 2016 census, the county's population was 80,040 in 21,216 households, by which time Hoseynabad-e Shomali Rural District had been separated from the county to join Sanandaj County.

Administrative divisions

The population history and structural changes of Divandarreh County's administrative divisions over three consecutive censuses are shown in the following table. The latest census shows three districts, eight rural districts, and two cities.

References

 

Counties of Kurdistan Province